Peter Schöttel (born 26 March 1967) is a retired Austrian footballer and manager. He currently works as a pundit for Sky Austria.

Club career
In his playing career Schöttel played exclusively for Rapid Vienna, making him a cult hero with Rapid fans. He was also Rapid's captain between 1997 and 2001. He won league and domestic cup titles with Rapid and played the full 90 minutes of the 1996 UEFA Cup Winners Cup Final against Paris St Germain in Brussels, which Rapid lost. In 1999, he was chosen as a member of Rapid's Team of the Century.

After finishing his playing career, he began working as a coach for the Rapid amateurs, continuing his association with the club until 2006. On 11 November 2006, after sustaining criticism for negotiating TV punditry contracts while allowing his duties at Rapid to wane, he left the club. In the summer of 2007, he began work as a trainer with Wiener Sportclub with his contract running until the end of June 2008.

His squad number, 5, was retired by Rapid Wien until the 2011 season as a mark of respect for Schöttel's playing career.

International career
Schöttel made his international debut for Austria in a February 1988 friendly match against Switzerland and was a participant at the 1990 FIFA World Cup and 1998 FIFA World Cup. He earned 62 caps but scored no goals. His final international match was the embarrassing 0–9 demolition by Spain in a European Championship qualifying match in March 1999. In 2002, he just played for four minutes in a friendly match against Norway for his official retirement.

Coaching career
In December 2009, Schöttel was appointed as manager to the Austrian Bundesliga club SC Wiener Neustadt. In 2011, he became manager of Rapid Wien. He was sacked on 17 April 2013. Schöttel was hired as Grödig head coach.

Coaching statistics

Honours

Player
Rapid Wien
Austrian Bundesliga: 1986–87, 1987–88, 1995–96
Austrian Cup: 1986–87, 1994–95

References

External links

1967 births
Living people
Austrian footballers
Austria international footballers
1990 FIFA World Cup players
1998 FIFA World Cup players
SK Rapid Wien players
Austrian Football Bundesliga players
SK Rapid Wien managers
Wiener Sport-Club managers
Association football defenders
Austrian football managers